Walter Elliot (17 February 1910 – 8 September 1988) was a British Conservative Party politician.

Elliot played seven Test matches for the England national rugby union team in the 1930s.

He was elected as Member of Parliament for Carshalton at a by-election in 1960, caused by the elevation to the peerage of the Conservative MP Antony Head.  Elliot held the seat until he stood down at the February 1974 general election.

References

External links 
 
Scrum: Walter Elliot

1910 births
1988 deaths
Conservative Party (UK) MPs for English constituencies
UK MPs 1959–1964
UK MPs 1964–1966
UK MPs 1966–1970
UK MPs 1970–1974
England international rugby union players